Chathanad is a small town in the heart of Alappuzha City in Kerala State, India. Chattanad is a municipal colony in Alappuzha. Pin code is 688001.
 
Chattanad is the residence of Marxist leader and former minister K. R. Gowri Amma.

References 

Villages in Alappuzha district